Mbongeni is a given name. Notable people with the name include:

Mbongeni Buthelezi (born 1966), South African artist
Mbongeni Khumalo, South African poet
Mbongeni Mzimela, South African footballer
Mbongeni Ngema, South African writer
Phesheya Mbongeni Dlamini, politician